Julien Billaut (born 26 November 1981) is a French slalom canoeist who competed at the international level from 1998 to 2009.

Billaut won four medals at the ICF Canoe Slalom World Championships, with three golds (K1: 2006, K1 team: 2005, 2006) and a silver (K1 team: 2007). He also won 1 gold and 2 bronzes at the European Championships.

World Cup individual podiums

1 World Championship counting for World Cup points

References

Official results from Prague 2006

French male canoeists
Living people
1981 births
Medalists at the ICF Canoe Slalom World Championships